Turf Club is a suburb of Johannesburg, South Africa. It is a small suburb south of the Johannesburg CBD and located next to the suburb of Turffontein. It is located in Region F of the City of Johannesburg Metropolitan Municipality.

History
Prior to the discovery of gold on the Witwatersrand in 1886, the suburb lay on land on one of the original farms called Turffontein. It became a suburb in 1923 and its name originates from the nearby Turffontein Racecourse.

References

Johannesburg Region F